Yair Rosenberg is a Jewish-American journalist and a staff writer at The Atlantic, where he launched the Deep Shtetl newsletter. He was formerly a senior writer at Tablet magazine.

Rosenberg is a regular speaker and commentator on Antisemitism in the modern era and on strategies to combat abuse on online platforms, addressing audiences across the world, including South By Southwest, the Jerusalem Global Forum for Combating Anti-Semitism, and the Limmud conference in Melbourne, Australia. Rosenberg has written for and been interviewed by The New York Times, Washington Post, Associated Press, CNN, Fast Company, CBC News, and The Rachel Maddow Show, among others.

Early life
Rosenberg attended the Modern Orthodox SAR High School in Riverdale, New York. He graduated from Harvard University, where he served as a staff writer at the Harvard Crimson, in 2012.  Rosenberg's paternal grandfather  Rabbi Israel David Rosenberg was a noted Hasidic Jewish composer who, as a young man, escaped Nazi Europe with the assistance of Japanese diplomat Chiune Sugihara, who issued him a visa. In time, Rosenberg’s grandfather ended up in China, eventually making his way to the United States.

Journalism career
Beginning in 2012, Rosenberg covered the U.S. and Israeli elections for The New York Times, Washington Post, The Atlantic, The Guardian, and the Wall Street Journal, among other outlets. He has interviewed and profiled multiple White House chiefs of staff and cabinet members. He also elicited a correction from the US Supreme Court on a point of Jewish history.

Until 2021, he was a senior writer at Tablet magazine, where he covered politics, culture, and religion, tackling topics ranging from American Jewish responses to modern critical scholarship of the Bible, to contemporary Islamophobia to the forgotten history of Mormon-Jewish relations. In particular, he has chronicled the resurgence of antisemitism in Europe and in America. He is also known for his parodies of antisemites on Twitter, and more serious efforts to combat abuse on online platforms, including a video series aimed at educating the uninitiated about the history, nuances, and dangers of modern-day antisemitism. While at Tablet, Rosenberg coined the sracastic Internet adage Goebbels Gap, which he defined as the amount of time between a negative event in the world and when someone blames it on the Jews.

In November 2021, he moved to The Atlantic, and began a newsletter called Deep Shtetl, where he continued his coverage of politics, culture, antisemitism, and social media dynamics, including an exploration of how a Jewish character came to be on the cult classic sci-fi show Firefly, the story behind the Hanukkah menorah used by Vice President Kamala Harris, an interview with celebrated Jewish author Dara Horn, and a deep dive into Albert Einstein's little-known 20-year friendship with Orthodox rabbi Chaim Tchernowitz.

Target of Antisemitism
In 2016, a report by the Anti-Defamation League's Task Force on Journalism and Harassment identified Rosenberg as the second-most targeted Jewish journalist receiving online antisemitic abuse due to his critical reporting on Donald Trump's candidacy, following conservative writer Ben Shapiro, and ahead of journalists Jeffrey Goldberg, Sally Kohn and Jake Tapper. "My parents didn't raise me to be number 2," he later wrote in The New York Times. "Fortunately, there's always 2020."

Since the report's publication, Rosenberg has focused extensively on the issue of online harassment and antisemitism, including through the creation of the "Impostor Buster" Twitter bot that exposed neo-Nazi trolls masquerading as minorities on the platform, which received  coverage from The New York Times and other global news outlets. Rosenberg also wrote about his experience and efforts to combat online abuse in the Times.

Music

Rosenberg is a singer and composer of original Jewish music. In March 2020, he released his first two singles, Shalom Aleichem and Lecha Dodi. His collaborators include singers Arun Viswanath and Abbaleh Savitt, as well as producer Charles Newman.

Awards
Rosenberg's writings have received awards from the Harvard Center for Jewish Studies and the Religion Newswriters Association. In 2017, he was named as one of "36 Under 36" by New York's Jewish Week newspaper.

References 

Living people
Jewish American journalists
Writers from New York (state)
American magazine journalists
Harvard University alumni
Year of birth missing (living people)
Jewish American activists
21st-century American Jews
Activists against antisemitism
Jewish singers
Jewish American musicians